In the Assamese alphabet, rô is the twenty-seventh consonant, or in other terms, twenty-seventh letter of the byônzônbôrnômala.

When vowels are added

Rô has an inherent vowel in it, which is ô, as in most other Assamese consonants. But, many a times, ô is to be replaced by another vowel or swôrôbôrnô. In such a case, the vowels change their forms.

As examples:

Words starting with 
  which means color
  which means red
  which means king

When added to other consonants

Reph
When  is added before another consonant to form a conjunct,  turns into reph. In other words, reph indicates that there is a r sound before the letter it is used before.

For example:
 
 
 
 
 
 
 
  etc.

Rô-kar
When  is added after another consonant,  changes into rô-kar. In other words, rô-kar after a consonant means that there is a rô sound after it.

For example:
 
 
 
 
  etc.

Some consonants change their shape when rô-kar is added.

For example:

References

Assamese language